Potęgowo railway station is in Słupsk County in Poland. It is on the line between Gdańsk and Stargard.

Lines crossing the station

Train services
The station is served by the following services:

Regional services (R) Tczew — Słupsk  
Regional services (R) Malbork — Słupsk  
Regional services (R) Elbląg — Słupsk  
Regional services (R) Słupsk — Bydgoszcz Główna 
Regional services (R) Słupsk — Gdynia Główna

References 

Railway stations in Pomeranian Voivodeship